Monodontides hondai is a butterfly of the family Lycaenidae. It is found in Palawan province of the Philippines.

References

 , 1983. Blue Butterflies of the Lycaenopsis Group: 1-309, 6 pls. London.

Monodontides
Butterflies described in 1983